Lorraine Jossob  (born 4 May 1993 in Keetmanshoop) is a Namibian women's international footballer who plays as a defender. She is a member of the Namibia women's national football team. She was part of the team at the 2014 African Women's Championship. On club level she played for Spfr. Neukirch in Germany.

References

1993 births
Living people
Namibian women's footballers
Namibia women's international footballers
People from Keetmanshoop
Women's association football defenders
Expatriate women's footballers in Germany
Namibian expatriate women's footballers